Bad Seed is a studio album by American country music artist Jan Howard. It was released in November 1966 via Decca Records and featured 12 tracks. The third studio album of her recording career, Bad Seed was named for its title track, which reached the top ten of the country charts in 1966. The disc was met with a favorable review from Cashbox following its release.

Background, recording and content
Jan Howard would reach her peak commercial success while recording for Decca Records in the sixties. At the label, she had her first top ten single in 1966 with "Evil on Your Mind". The song would be followed by the successful single, "Bad Seed". Howard's next album would be named for her second top ten single. It was recorded in three separate sessions between August and September 1966. The sessions took place at the Columbia Recording Studio, located in Nashville, Tennessee and was produced by Owen Bradley. 

The disc consisted of 12 tracks. According to the album's liner notes, the songs for the project were chosen by both Owen Bradley and Howard. The pair chose two songs that were written by her husband (and Nashville songwriter), Harlan Howard. Among his compositions was "Ain't Had No Lovin'", which was a number two country single in 1966 for Connie Smith. Other covers on the disc included Roy Clark's "The Tip of My Fingers", Bill Anderson's "I Get the Fever", Bonnie Guitar's "Get Your Lie the Way You Want It" and Jack Greene's "There Goes My Everything". Sandy Posey's pop single, "Born a Woman", is also featured on the album.

Critical reception and release
Bad Seed was released in November 1966 on Decca Records. It was originally distributed as a vinyl LP with six songs on each side of the record. It was the third studio album of Howard's recording career and her second for Decca. It was reviewed favorably by Cashbox magazine in 1966, commenting that the disc had "that hit groove, as well as a batch of hit songs from other sources." The album reached a peak of 13 on the Billboard Top Country Albums chart in January 1968. The disc's only single was the title track. It was originally issued by Decca in September 1966. It reached number 10 on the Billboard Hot Country Singles chart, becoming Howard's second top ten song as a recording artist.

Track listing

Personnel
All credits are adapted from liner notes of Bad Seed.

Musical and technical personnel
 Harold Bradley – guitar
 Owen Bradley – producer
 Floyd Cramer – piano, organ, vibes
 Ray Edenton – guitar
 Buddy Harman – drums
 Jan Howard – lead vocals, background vocals
 Roy Huskey – bass
 Grady Martin – guitar, dobro
 Hargus "Pig" Robbins – piano, organ, vibes
 Pete Wade – guitar

Chart performance

Release history

References

1966 albums
Jan Howard albums
Decca Records albums
Albums produced by Owen Bradley